Schuyler Shibley (March 19, 1820 – December 18, 1890) was an Ontario businessman and political figure in Upper Canada. He represented Addington in the House of Commons of Canada as a Liberal-Conservative member from 1872 to 1878.

He was born in Portland Township, Upper Canada in 1820. He studied at the Waterloo Academy near Kingston and settled on a farm at Murvale in Portland Township. He served as reeve for the township and later warden for Frontenac County.  Shibley had an affair with Kate Davis of Lambtom County and they had a child together; they were both accused in the death of this child but both were later released: Shibley, because he had not been present when the child died, and Davis after she was acquitted of manslaughter. In 1867, he was defeated by James Lapum for the Addington seat in the House of Commons; he was elected in 1872 as an independent Conservative. In 1873, he defected to the Liberals.

He died in Kingston in 1890.

His uncle Jacob Shibley had represented Frontenac in the Legislative Assembly of Upper Canada.

Electoral record 

On Mr. Shibley being unseated, on petition, 21 September 1874:

External links
 
 

1820 births
1890 deaths
Conservative Party of Canada (1867–1942) MPs
Liberal Party of Canada MPs
Members of the House of Commons of Canada from Ontario
Canadian Methodists